David "Dave" Blass is an American production designer and art director.

Work 

For his work on the Justified television series Blass was nominated for the 2012 Primetime Emmy Award for Outstanding Art Direction for a Single-Camera Series for the Justified television series, and also received nominations for the Primetime Emmy Award for Outstanding Production Design for a Narrative Contemporary Program (One Hour or More) for Justified in 2014 and again in 2015 for the Constantine television series. In 2015 he was also nominated for the  Art Directors Guild Award for Excellence in Production Design for a One Hour Contemporary Television Series for Justified, He has twice been published with cover stories in Perspective Magazine, with a Oct/Nov 2009 article on his pre-visualization of the final shot for the ER television series, and February/March 2012 featuring an article on his production design of the Justified series. For his work accurately portraying the State of Kentucky on the Television program Justified he was awarded the honor of "Kentucky Colonel in 2011 by Governor Steven Beshear.

He is a member of the Art Directors Guild and the Academy of Television Arts & Sciences.

Personal life

Blass grew up in Ashland, Massachusetts and graduated from the Ashland High School, where he wrote and directed his first film, A SADD Story, for "Students Against Drunk Driving" – which won a Reader's Digest contest.  He also played soccer and baseball while at Ashland High. His film achievement in high school led to him receiving a scholarship to attend the Emerson College in Boston, where he majored in film production. He then moved to California and began working in the film and television industry – initially working under Roger Corman. He is married to Michelle Blass (Usling).

Filmography

Production design and art direction for television series

Production design for films includes

Writer/director credits

Director for music videos 
 Teutonic Terror and Pandemic & Producer Stampede (for the German heavy metal band Accept)

Executive producer for television series

References

External links 

 Architectural Digest: "Go Behind the Scenes of Pitch- Production designer Dave Blass gives AD a tour of the new Fox series"
 Architectural Digest: "Secrets and Lies Season Two Has a New Case and New Sets" 
 Perspective Magazine July-Aug 2020 
 Perspective Magazine July–August 2017 
 Variety Magazine: Dave Blass on Mark Worthington 
 Variety Magazine: Dave Blass on Derek Hill 
 Variety Magazine: Dave Blass on Ray Yamagata 
 Set Decorators Society of America: Justified
 Red Giant Software: "Rocking out with Toonit and Accept"
 Blabbermouth: "Behind the Scenes with Accept's Pandemic" 
  Nuclear Blast Artist Accept's "Stamped"
 AMC's "The Phantom Eye" Review 
 World Building Institute Member 
 
 Dave Blass official website 

American art directors
American production designers
Living people
Emerson College alumni
People from Ashland, Massachusetts
Year of birth missing (living people)